The Infraclavicular fossa is an indentation, or fossa, immediately below the clavicle, above the third rib and between the deltoid muscle laterally and medioclavicular line medially.

See also
 Supraclavicular fossa

References

Thorax (human anatomy)